Sudhakar Reddy Yakkanti is an Indian film cinematographer, turned director, screenwriter, editor and producer known for his works in Hindi, Telugu, and Marathi cinema. In 1999, Reddy made his foray into cinema as assistant director of photography under Ajayan Vincent with Telugu films such as Raja Kumarudu, and Yamajathakudu.

Background
Reddy was born on 23 March 1976 in Guntur, Andhra Pradesh into a Telugu speaking family. Reddy holds A Bachelor of Fine Arts in Photography from Jawaharlal Nehru Architecture and Fine Arts University, Hyderabad, and post graduate diploma in Cinematography from Film and Television Institute of India, Pune.

Career 
Reddy ventured into parallel cinema with the 2003 short film Ek Aakash for which Reddy received the National Film Award – Special Jury Award – "For starting off as a simple rivalry of two kids from different backgrounds; in kite flying, becomes a battle of one-upmanship. Both are led by their ego and aggressive instincts, but eventually reach a point when they need others help" as cited by the Jury.

Ek Aakash has also garnered various international accolades such as Best Youth and Children's film at the Association for International Broadcasting, Special Mention at International Film Festival for Young and Children, Argentina, and was featured at Four Art Film Fest, Slovakia. In 2018 he directed the Marathi feature film Naal for which he received the National Film Award for Best First Film of a Director trophy.

Filmography
As a co-producer
 2018: Naal (Marathi film; also director)
 2019: George Reddy

As short film director
 2003: Ek Aakash (Silent film)
 2007: II Rewind
 2015: Road Safety Film: Jyada Akalmandi

As assistant director of photography
 1999: Rajakumarudu (assistant director of photography)
 1999: Yamajathakudu (assistant director of photography)

As cinematographer

References

External links
 

1976 births
Telugu people
People from Guntur
Telugu film producers
Indian cinematographers
Telugu film cinematographers
Marathi film directors
Marathi screenwriters
Film producers from Andhra Pradesh
Cinematographers from Andhra Pradesh
Film directors from Andhra Pradesh
21st-century Indian film directors
21st-century Indian dramatists and playwrights
Screenwriters from Andhra Pradesh
Film and Television Institute of India alumni
Producers who won the Best Debut Feature Film of a Director National Film Award
Director whose film won the Best Debut Feature Film National Film Award
Living people
21st-century Indian screenwriters